Launaea gorgadensis is a species of flowering plants of the family Asteraceae. The species is endemic to Cape Verde. It is listed as a critically endangered plant by the IUCN.

Distribution
The species is found in the northwest of Cape Verde, in the islands of Santo Antão, São Vicente and São Nicolau. The plant occurs between  elevation. It is a mesophyte plant which grows in sub-humid and semi-arid areas.

References

gorgadensis
Endemic flora of Cape Verde
Flora of Santo Antão, Cape Verde
Flora of São Nicolau, Cape Verde
Flora of São Vicente, Cape Verde